Vendetta Records was a dance record label subsidiary of A&M Records. It was launched in 1988, but it was shut down in 1990, shortly after its parent was purchased by PolyGram Records.

Artists
Brat Pack
Denise Lopez
Reimy
Dirty South
The 28th Street Crew
Seduction
Maurice
Knight Time
Michael Bow
Victor Simonelli

See also
 List of record labels

American record labels
A&M Records
Record labels established in 1988
Record labels disestablished in 1990
Electronic dance music record labels